Julio Cesar Salamanca Pineda (born 15 July 1989) is a Salvadoran weightlifter. He competed at the 2012 Summer Olympics in the Men's 62 kg, finishing 11th. He also competed at the 2016 Summer Olympics in the Men's 62 kg, ranking 2nd in Group B.

Salamanca won the 62 kg gold medal in clean & jerk and silver in snatch during the 2014 Pan American Sports Festival.

References

1989 births
Living people
Salvadoran male weightlifters
Olympic weightlifters of El Salvador
Weightlifters at the 2012 Summer Olympics
Weightlifters at the 2016 Summer Olympics
Pan American Games competitors for El Salvador
Weightlifters at the 2011 Pan American Games
Weightlifters at the 2015 Pan American Games
Central American and Caribbean Games silver medalists for El Salvador
Central American and Caribbean Games bronze medalists for El Salvador
Competitors at the 2010 Central American and Caribbean Games
Weightlifters at the 2019 Pan American Games
Central American and Caribbean Games medalists in weightlifting
20th-century Salvadoran people
21st-century Salvadoran people